HMS Calypso (D61) was a C class cruiser of the Caledon sub-class of the Royal Navy, launched in 1917 and sunk in 1940 by the Italian submarine . Calypso was built by Hawthorn Leslie and Company. Her keel was laid down in February 1916 and she was completed in June 1917.

First World War
Calypso fought in the Second Battle of Heligoland Bight on 17 November 1917, when she and her sister ship  were part of the force that intercepted  Imperial German Navy minesweepers near the German coast. During the battle, Calypsos bridge was struck by a  shell which killed everyone on the bridge including the captain and caused the accidental firing of a ready torpedo.

Interwar
Calypso went to the rescue of the Greek royal family in 1922 after King Constantine of Greece abdicated and a military dictatorship seized power. The King's brother, Prince Andrew of Greece and Denmark was banished for life by a revolutionary court and was forced to flee with his family, which included his 18-month-old son Philip who would later become Prince Philip, Duke of Edinburgh. The British Government had received news of the situation, and dispatched Calypso to evacuate the family. They boarded with minimal possessions. Philip was carried on board in a cot made from an orange box. The family were taken to Brindisi, Italy, where they were put on a train to Paris.

On 2 November 1924, the destroyer  was steaming in the Grand Harbour upon returning to Valletta, Malta, from a cruise in the Western Mediterranean Sea when she accidentally rammed and sank a motorboat from Calypso. All four people aboard the motorboat were saved by a boat from the destroyer .

Second World War
During the early part of the Second World War, Calypso served with the 7th Cruiser Squadron on Northern Patrol duty as a blockade ship in the North Sea between Scotland and Iceland. On 24 September 1939, Calypso intercepted the German merchant ship Minden south of Iceland. The crew of Minden scuttled their ship before she could be captured. On 22 November, Calypso captured the German merchant ship Konsul Hendrik Fisser off Iceland. In early 1940, Calypso was sent to Alexandria in the eastern Mediterranean.

Thirty nine sailors from Calypso perished in the sinking. The majority of her survivors were rescued by the destroyer  and taken to Alexandria.

Notes

Bibliography

External links
 HMS Calypso at Uboat.net

 

C-class cruisers
Ships built on the River Tyne
1917 ships
World War I cruisers of the United Kingdom
World War II cruisers of the United Kingdom
Ships sunk by Italian submarines
World War II shipwrecks in the Mediterranean Sea
Maritime incidents in June 1940